The Diocese of Southern Malawi-Upper Shire is one of the four diocese in Malawi within the Church of the Province of Central Africa: the current bishop is Brighton Vitta Malasa.

References

Anglicanism in Malawi
Southern Malawi-Upper Shire